Agora É que São Elas is a Brazilian telenovela produced and broadcast by TV Globo. It premiered on 24 March 2003, replacing Sabor da Paixão, and ended on 6 September 2003, replaced by Chocolate com Pimenta. The telenovela is written by Ricardo Linhares, based on an original idea by Paulo José.

It stars Débora Falabella, Paulo Vilhena, Vera Fischer, Miguel Falabella, Marisa Orth, Thiago Fragoso, Maurício Mattar, and Francisca Queiroz.

Cast 
 Débora Falabella as  Leonarda "Léo" Mendes Galvão
 Paulo Vilhena as Vitório "Vito" Augusto Ramos Zabelheira
 Vera Fischer as Antônia Mendes Galvão
 Miguel Falabella as João Carlos Ramos Zabelheira "Juca Tigre"
 Marisa Orth as Vaneide Ramos Zabelheira "Vanvan"
 Thiago Fragoso as Rodrigo de Sá Ramos Zabelheira
 Maurício Mattar as Pedro Marques de Mello
 Francisca Queiroz as Maria da Soledade "Sol" Ramos Zabelheira
 Paulo Gorgulho as Joaquim Galvão
 Daniel Ávila as Bruno Mendes Galvão
 Thaís Fersoza as Fátima "Fatinha" Castro Martins
 Rodrigo Prado as Vinícius Castro
 Max Fercondini as Hugo Pitombo
 Sthefany Brito as Elis Pacheco 
 Karina Bacchi as Pâmela Bittencourt
 Danni Carlos as Bárbara Guedes "Neném"
 Raoni Carneiro as Felipe Guedes "Montanha"
 Zezé Polessa as Cristina Castro "Tintim"
 Nuno Leal Maia as Honório Castro
 Maria Zilda Bethlem as Ruth "Rutinha" Pitombo
 Otávio Augusto as Modesto Pitombo
 Yoná Magalhães as Sofia Ramos Zabelheira
 Fernanda Paes Leme as Karina Sampaio
 Márcio Kieling as Djalma "Djalminha" Nogueira
 Jerusa Franco as Fernanda "Nanda" Pacheco
 Duda Nagle as Dario Matos "Peteca"
 Preta Gil as Vanusa Silveira
 Ildi Silva as Rosemary "Rose" Silveira
 Joana Fomm as Dinorá Silveira
 Otávio Müller as Deputy Silésio Junqueira
 Karla Tenório as Heloísa
 Hugo Gross as Rogério Frota
 Rodrigo dos Santos as Wanderley Silveira
 Ana Kutner as Silmara
 Anna Cotrim as Ximena
 Lana Guelero as Dadá Matos
 Edyr Duqui as Guadalupe
 Catarina Abdala as Nélia
 João Antônio as Tobias
 Leandro Ribeiro as Iranildo
 Larissa Queiroz as Francisca "Xica"
 Camille Hess as Maria Clara Mendes Galvão
 Thiago Oliveira as Luís Felipe Marques de Mello
 Thaiane Maciel as Alice Marques de Mello
 Nathália França as Raíssa Pacheco 
 Natália Souto as Jane Matos
 Samuel Melo as Bento

Guest stars 
 Francisco Cuoco as Raul Ramos Zabelheira
 Laura Cardoso as Cartomante
 Cássia Kiss as Luísa 
 Paulo José as Dr. Benigno
 Ana Rosa as Solange 
 Marcos Winter as Heitor 
 Suzana Pires as Lia
 Aracy Cardoso as Jandira
 Hélio Ribeiro as Dr. Cintra
 Jardel Mello as Dr. Matos
 Cristina Mullins as Dr. Selma
 Cláudia Lira as Gardênia
 Henri Pagnocelli as Dr. Celso
 Antônio Pitanga as Ezequiel
 Daniela Pessoa as Sirlene
 Ana Luíza Camacho as Carolina
 Pietra Victória as Joana

References

External links 
 

2003 telenovelas
TV Globo telenovelas
Brazilian telenovelas
2003 Brazilian television series debuts
2003 Brazilian television series endings
2000s Brazilian television series
Portuguese-language telenovelas